The International Volleyball Association was a short lived co-ed professional volleyball league in the United States from 1975 to 1980. Like other major sports leagues in the United States, it had two geographic divisions. However, its teams were entirely in the west. It is one of the few examples of a professional sports league where men and women competed on the same teams.

In keeping with the "International" name, the league included one team, El Paso-Juarez Sol, which acknowledged both sides of the international twin town in its name.

Divisions

The league started with 5 teams in 1975, but split into two divisions with the addition of the Tucson Turquoise in 1976. The two divisions were Western, which consisted of teams on the Pacific Coast, and a second, called Eastern in 1975 and Continental after 1977, for teams from the Rocky Mountain states.

The only team from the Eastern or Continental Division to win a championship was the Tucson Sky in 1979.

Teams

The teams and the years of existence were:

Venues:
 The Diablos played their home games at the San Jose Civic Auditorium.

Season by year

1975

Regular Season

The league consisted of a single division. The top three teams made the playoffs, with the top team receiving a bye in the first round.

Playoffs

Round 1

Championship (Best 3 of 5)

1976

Regular Season

The league was split into two divisions: The Eastern Division and the Western Division.  The top five teams made the playoffs.  The top team from each division received a bye in first round.

Eastern Division

Western Division

Playoffs and Championship

Best 3 of 5

Round 1

Round 2

Championship

1977

Regular Season

The league remained divided into two divisions. The Eastern Division from the previous season was renamed the Continental Division. The top two teams from each division played for the division championship, with the winners advancing to play for the league title.

Continental Division

Western Division

Playoffs and Championships

Best 3 out of 5

Continental Division

Western Division

Championship

Records

Attendance

The league's total attendance during the 1977 regular season was 227,058, which set a new record for the league.  Including both the regular season and the postseason, the league's total attendance was 240,803.

Awards

Most Valuable Male Player:  Ed Skorek (El Paso-Juarez Sol)

Most Valuable Female Player:  Rosie Wegrich (San Diego Breakers)

Coach of the Year:  Dodge Parker (Orange County Stars)

All-IVA First Team

Ed Skorek (El Paso-Juarez Sol)

Rosie Wegrich (San Diego Breakers)

Jon Stanley (Denver Comets)

Stan Gosciniak (Phoenix Heat)

Hilary Johnson (Orange County Stars)

Jon Roberts (Orange County Stars)

All-IVA Second Team

Jose Garcia (Santa Barbara Spikers)

Linda Fernandez (Santa Barbara Spikers)

Bebeto DeFreitas (Santa Barbara Spikers)

Larry Benecke (Denver Comets)

Scott English (Phoenix Heat)

Dodge Parker (Orange County Stars)

Mercedes Gonzalez (Tucson Sky)

1978

Regular Season

The final standings for the season are incomplete. The latest published standings for the league that list the win–loss records for every team read as follows:

Continental Division

West Division

Before the playoffs began, the league announced that the Tucson Sky had forfeited their August 19 match against the San Diego Breakers, which had not been played due to the Sky's flight being delayed.  After forfeiting the match, Tucson's final record was 21-15, while San Diego's record was 11-25.  The Santa Barbara Spikers and Orange County Stars finished the season with the records shown in the table above. The El Paso-Juarez Sol finished with a 16-20 record.

Playoffs and Championship

In the Continental Division playoffs, the Tucson Sky faced the El Paso-Juarez Sol.  Tucson won the first match at El Paso on August 31 in three straight sets (12-7, 12-3, 12-5). In the following match, which was played in Tucson on September 4, the Sky won 3-0 (13-11, 12-5, 12-7) to move into the finals.

In the West Division playoffs, the Santa Barbara Spikers played the Orange County Stars.  The Stars won the first match, which was played on September 1, 3-1 (12-3, 12-9, 5-12, 15-13).  On September 3, Santa Barbara won the second match 3-0 (12-10, 12-4, 12-10).  With the series tied 1-1, the teams then played a tiebreaker, which Santa Barbara won 12-6 to advance to the finals.

In the finals, the Sky and Spikers played a close opening match on September 6.  The Sky ultimately won 3-2 (12-6, 8-12, 12-10, 3-12, 6-3). Santa Barbara won the second match, which was played the following night, 3-0 (12-8, 12-5, 12-9).  The match was immediately followed by a tiebreaker for the league title, which was at one point tied 8-8 before Santa Barbara scored four consecutive points to win 12-8.

The players for Santa Barbara were Reede Reynolds (USA), Luis Eymard (Brazil), Jose Luis Garcia (Mexico), Bebeto de Freitas (Brazil), Larry Milliken, Sue Herrington, Rosie Wegrich and Peter Stefaniuk.

Records and Statistics

The Tucson Sky's Scott English set four playoff match records for highest average (.700), highest efficiency (.650), most service aces (four), and most service aces in a series (seven).  Tucson's Irma Cordero set playoff records for the highest serve receiving average (.962) and with two other players set the record for the highest serve receiving average in a match (1.000).  Rosie Wegrich of the Santa Barbara Spikers played in her thirty-third playoff match, setting the new league record.

The Tucson Sky set three playoff match records, including highest average (.588), most service aces (eight), and most service aces in a series (24).

Attendance

Tucson led the league with 2,347 fans per game, while the expansion Seattle Smashers averaged 2,306 fans per game after the All-Star break.  The league's total attendance during the regular season (247,661) was nearly ten percent higher than it had been the previous season.  Including the postseason, the IVA's total attendance for 1978 was 264,292.

Awards

Most Valuable Male Player:  Bebeto DeFreitas (Santa Barbara Spikers)

Most Valuable Female Player:  Rosie Wegrich (Santa Barbara Spikers)

Coach of the Year:  Byron Shewman (Tucson Sky)

All-IVA First Team

Luiz Eymard (Santa Barbara Spikers)

Bebeto DeFreitas (Santa Barbara Spikers)

Rosie Wegrich (Santa Barbara Spikers)

Garth Pischke (El Paso-Juarez Sol)

Scott English (Tucson Sky)

Irma Cordero (Tucson Sky)

All-IVA Second Team

Ed Skorek (Seattle Smashers)

Linda Fernandez (Seattle Smashers)

Jon Stanley (Denver Comets)

Jon Robert (Orange County Stars)

Dodge Parker (Orange County Stars)

Hilary Johnson (San Diego Breakers)

1979

Regular Season

The league remained divided into two divisions. Similar to the playoff format from the year before, the top two teams in each division played for the division championships, with the winners advancing to the league championship.

Continental Division

Western Division

Playoffs and Championship

Best 3 out of 5

Continental Division

Western Division

Championship

1980
The IVA fell apart during the 1980 season.  On June 11, the owners of the San Jose Diablos halted operations.  On June 12, William Levy, the owner of the Santa Barbara Spikers, sold the team to Don Moger.  Moger planned to move the team to Los Angeles.  The league refused to approve the sale, believing that Moger planned to move the Spikers to Los Angeles during the season instead of waiting until 1981.  Following the league's decision, Levy chose not to finance the team, which played no games after June 17. Next, the partnership that owned the Albuquerque Lasers announced on June 16 that it did not have enough money to continue running the franchise.  Jim Matison and Don Sammis, who owned the Tucson Sky and Salt Lake Stingers, respectively, attempted to come to an agreement to purchase the league and keep it running.  However, Sammis withdrew from the deal on July 9, and the league subsequently collapsed.

Notable players

NBA great Wilt Chamberlain played for the Southern California Bangers in 1975, but did not play in 1976.  When he became an investor in the IVA and president of the league in 1977, he returned as a player for the Orange County Stars. He played for the Seattle Smashers in 1978 and the Albuquerque Lasers in 1979.

See also
 National Volleyball Association (US)
 Volleyball in the United States

Notes

External links
 International Volleyball Association Standings
 International Volleyball Association at  Major League Sports Almanac

Volleyball competitions in the United States
Defunct sports leagues in the United States
Volleyball organizations
Sports organizations established in 1975
Organizations disestablished in 1980
1975 establishments in the United States
1980 disestablishments in the United States
Multi-national professional sports leagues